Houssin Bezzai  (born 4 November 1978) is a former professional footballer. He played for Sparta Rotterdam, TOP Oss and Haarlem.

Playing career
Bezzai came to the Netherlands at a young age, and made his debut in professional football on 7 November 1999 as part of Sparta Rotterdam in a 1–2 home loss to Ajax in the Eredivisie. He came on as a substitute for Steve Goossen in the 31st minute. He played his last professional game on 14 April 2006 as part of HFC Haarlem, when he was replaced by Ray Fränkel after 86 minutes in the 1–3 loss to PEC Zwolle. After his retirement from professional football in August 2006, Bezzai joined the amateur club Ter Leede. 

Bezzai was a Moroccan youth international and won the 1997 African Youth Championship.

Retirement
After his football career, Bezzai founded Sport United together with a partner. The company focuses, among other things, on the organisation of events and career counseling for athletes. Within the company, vulnerable youths are also guided through work and education. At the end of 2010, this work culminated in Fruit & Go – a smoothie / sandwich bar in Leiden, which was founded together with fellow former professional footballer Tim de Cler. That company merged into the Leids Inzet Collectief, a secondment company for youths with an occupational disability. Since March 2020, Bezzai has also been program manager for racism and discrimination at the Royal Dutch Football Association (KNVB).

Honours

International
Morocco U20
 Africa U-20 Cup of Nations: 1997

References

1978 births
Living people
Association football defenders
Dutch footballers
Moroccan footballers
Sparta Rotterdam players
TOP Oss players
HFC Haarlem players
Ter Leede players
Quick Boys players
People from El Aioun Sidi Mellouk
Morocco under-20 international footballers